Edward Andreasyan (born 21 April 1973), is an Armenian politician, Member of the National Assembly of Armenia of Bright Armenia's faction.

References 

1973 births
Living people
21st-century Armenian politicians